Novokilimovo (Yañı Kilem) is a rural locality (a village) in Gafuriysky Selsoviet, Buzdyaksky District, Bashkortostan, Russia. The population was 88 as of 2010. There is 1 street.

Geography 
Novokilimovo is located 15 km southeast of Buzdyak (the district's administrative centre) by road. Mikhaylovka is the nearest rural locality.

References 

Rural localities in Buzdyaksky District